San Pier may refer to:

 San Pier Niceto, municipality in the Province of Messina in the Italian region Sicily, Italy
 San Pier d'Isonzo, town and comune in the province of Gorizia, northern Italy

See also

 San Pier Maggiore (disambiguation)
 San Pietro (disambiguation)
 Pier (disambiguation)